Bagrus is a genus of  bagrid catfishes. These are relatively large catfish found in freshwater habitats in Africa, except for the virtually unknown B. tucumanus from South America, which likely is a synonym of Luciopimelodus pati.

Taxonomy
The present scientific name Bagrus was first proposed by Louis Augustin Guillaume Bosc in 1816 for the bayad and its closest relatives. Although in 1809, Geoffroy Saint-Hilaire had already separated this fish in his new genus Porcus. But this was overruled by the ICZN, so that the junior synonym could continue to be used.

Species 
Eleven living species are placed here:

 Bagrus bajad (Forsskål, 1775) (Bayad)
 Bagrus caeruleus T. R. Roberts & D. J. Stewart, 1976
 Bagrus degeni Boulenger, 1906
 Bagrus docmak (Forsskål, 1775) (Semutundu)
 Bagrus filamentosus Pellegrin, 1924
 Bagrus lubosicus Lönnberg, 1924
 Bagrus meridionalis Günther, 1894 (Kampango, Kampoyo)
 Bagrus orientalis Boulenger, 1902
 Bagrus tucumanus Burmeister, 1861
 Bagrus ubangensis Boulenger, 1902
 Bagrus urostigma Vinciguerra, 1895 (Somalia Catfish)

A possible fossil Bagrus from about 7 million years ago, found in Late Miocene Baynunah Formation rocks near Ruwais (Abu Dhabi), has been described:
 Bagrus shuwaiensis Forey & Young, 1999
However, it is not quite clear whether it belongs in Bagrus or some other Bagridae genus, or even in the Claroteidae.

References
  (2007): Checklist of catfishes, recent and fossil (Osteichthyes: Siluriformes), and catalogue of siluriform primary types. Zootaxa 1418: 1–628. PDF fulltext

 
Catfish genera
Catfish of Africa
Freshwater fish genera
Bagridae
Taxa named by Louis Augustin Guillaume Bosc